The U.S. Open is one of the five major tournaments in the Professional Bowlers Association. Despite its status as a PBA Tour major, the tournament is open to qualifying amateurs as well as PBA members. The U.S. Open is considered one of the most difficult tournaments to bowl in today, due to its long format (56 games from opening qualifying through the match play rounds; 64 games if a player from the pre-tournament qualifier makes it through) and demanding oil pattern, which differs from most oil patterns the PBA employs.

Tournament history
With the exception of 1997 and 2014, the U.S. Open has been held in some form every year since . Prior to 1971, this event was known as the BPAA All-Star. Andy Varipapa is notable for winning back-to-back BPAA All-Star titles in 1947 and 1948, the second coming at age 57, which makes him this tournament's oldest winner.  BPAA All-Star winners in the PBA era (1959–1970) were initially not credited with PBA titles for their victories. A rule change in 2008, however, retroactively awarded titles to the winners if they were PBA members at the time of their victories. Because the 1959 BPAA All-Star occurred before the PBA's debut, Harry Smith (1960) is considered the first PBA titlist in a BPAA All-Star event.
 
The first modern-day U.S. Open tournament in the PBA took place in 1971 and was won by Mike Limongello. With five wins, Pete Weber holds the most U.S. Open trophies of all time, one more than his father, Dick Weber, and Don Carter. Pete Weber is also the only player to win a U.S. Open title in four different decades (1988, 1991, 2004, 2007 and 2012). The last player to successfully defend a U.S. Open title was Dave Husted, who won the event in 1995 and 1996.

The 1987 U.S. Open, sponsored by Seagram Wine Coolers, offered a then-record total purse of $500,000, and was the first PBA tournament to award a $100,000 first prize (won by Del Ballard Jr.).

Unable to find viable sponsorship, the U.S. Open was canceled for 2014, amid speculation that the tournament may not return at all. However, the USBC and BPAA later reached a three-year agreement that brought the tournament back for 2015, 2016 and 2017. The USBC and BPAA secured Bowlmor AMF, at the time the largest operator of bowling centers in the world, as the title sponsor for 2015. The 2015 tournament took place November 2–8 in Garland, Texas.

Beginning in 2017 with the U.S. Open held at Flamingo Bowl in Liverpool, New York, the tournament instituted a partial invitational field for the first time. Among those invited are top money leaders among PBA members, top performers from a variety of USBC events, members of Team USA and Junior Team USA, winners of the past ten U.S. Opens, the last three winners from each of the PBA's other major championships, and winners of the current year PBA Regional Tour U.S. Open qualifier tournaments. The "open" portion of the tournament is actually a pre-tournament qualifier (PTQ) with a maximum of 80 entries. Top finishers from the eight-game PTQ then join all those who accepted invitations to round out the starting field of 144 players. The 2018 event had 116 invitational entries and only 28 open spots available via the PTQ. In 2019, only 91 invitees entered the tournament, so 53 open spots were filled from the PTQ.

Format
Starting in 2020, the starting field has been limited to only 108 players.  After the starting field is determined, players bowl 24 qualifying games in three 8-game blocks on three different lane conditions. The top 36 in pinfall advance to the cashers round for 8 more games. The top 24 players after the cashers round then bowl 24 round-robin, head-to-head match play games, all on the same 41-foot pattern. In the match play round, players are awarded actual pinfall plus 30 bonus pins for every match won (15 bonus pins each in the case of a tie). The top five after the match play round advance to the televised championship finals, which is on the same oil pattern as match play.

Current champion

2023 Event
The 2023 U.S. Open was held at Woodland Bowl in Indianapolis, Indiana on January 30 to February 5, with a pre-tournament qualifier (PTQ) on January 29. The tournament had a starting field of 108 players (after PTQ qualifiers were added) and a total prize fund of $300,750, with a $100,000 top prize. Having earned the top seed for the second year in a row, E. J. Tackett defeated No. 5 seed Kyle Troup in the championship match to earn his first U.S. Open title and third major title, while also making him the ninth player in PBA history to earn the career Triple Crown. 

Prize Pool:
1. E.J. Tackett (Bluffton, Indiana) – $100,000
2. Kyle Troup (Taylorsville, North Carolina) – $50,000
3. Tomas Käyhkö (Finland) – $25,000
4. Anthony Simonsen (Las Vegas, Nevada) – $16,000
5. Richard Teece (Feltham, England) – $10,000

Past champions

U.S. Open champions

BPAA All-Star champions
 1942 – John Crimmons
 1943 – Connie Schwoegler
 1944 – Ned Day 
 1945 – Buddy Bomar
 1946 – Joe Wilman
 1947 – Andy Varipapa
 1948 – Andy Varipapa
 1949 – Connie Schwoegler 
 1950 – Junie McMahon
 1951 – Dick Hoover
 1952 – Junie McMahon 
 1953 – Don Carter
 1954 – Don Carter 
 1955 – Steve Nagy 
 1956 – Bill Lilliard
 1957 – Don Carter 
 1958 – Don Carter 
 1959 – Billy Welu
 1960 – Harry Smith
 1961 – Bill Tucker 
 1962 – Dick Weber
 1963 – Dick Weber
 1964 – Bob Strampe Sr.
 1965 – Dick Weber
 1966 – Dick Weber
 1967 – Les Schissler
 1968 - Jim Stefanich
 1969 – Billy Hardwick
 1970 – Bobby Cooper

U.S. Open oil pattern
The U.S. Open featured what PBA.com describes as "the toughest lane oil design in all of bowling." The pattern is considered "flat," meaning equal amounts of oil are applied to every lane board. (A typical lane condition allows more oil in the middle section of lane boards, and lesser amounts on the outer boards.)

Many claim the oil pattern was responsible for the lack of left-handed winners in this tournament, because there isn't enough ball traffic on the left side to create a "track area."  When Mike Scroggins won the 2009 event in North Brunswick, New Jersey, he became the first left-hander in 20 years (Mike Aulby, 1989) to earn a U.S. Open title. Aulby's win was on an oil pattern where oil was applied more heavily on the outer boards (that is, those closest to the gutters), to the point where the outer parts of the lanes were effectively unplayable.  In all, left-handers accounted for six victories (McGrath [1973], Moser [1976], Petraglia [1977], Cook [1986], Aulby [1989], and Scroggins [2009]) and nine runner-up finishes (Anthony [1973, 1979, 1980], Davis [1974], Devers [1992], Bohn [1994], Couch [1999], Allen [2005], Scroggins [2010]) at the U.S. Open since 1971.  It was also the only major title that left-hander and 43-time titlist Earl Anthony never won in his career, though he did finish runner-up three times. In recent years, lefties Ryan Ciminelli (2015) and Rhino Page (2017) have won U.S. Opens.

See also
U.S. Women's Open

References

External links
 PBA.com Site

Ten-pin bowling competitions in the United States